Emeka Ani  is a Nigerian actor, producer, and director.

Personal life 
In 2021, he solicited funds and support to pay for hospital bills and continuing health care following a stroke. He received six million naira from the religious leader Jeremiah Fufeyin.

Filmography 

 Issakaba (2000)
 The Last Burial (2000)
 Abuja Connection (2003)
 Ogbo Nke Ajuala (2020)
 Desperate Billionaire (2005)
 Kissing the Wind (2006)
 My American Nurse (2006)
 666 (Beware the End Is at Hand) 1 & 2 (2007)
 Church on Fire 1 & 2 (2008)
 Sometime in July (2018)
 Snake girl (2006) 
 The snake girl II
 Okoto the messenger (2011)
 Serpant in paradise
 No more love II
 Serpant in paradise II 
 Family mistake

References

External links 

Living people
Nigerian male film actors
Nigerian male television actors
Nigerian male stage actors
Nigerian film directors
21st-century Nigerian male actors
Year of birth missing (living people)
Nigerian film producers
Igbo male actors
20th-century Nigerian male actors